The Conservative Party, abbreviated to KONS, is a small centre-right political party in the Czech Republic. The party opposes socialism, and advocates economic liberalism and reduction of taxes and public spending.

History 
Founded in 1990, the party merged with the Union Republicans in 1993, and the Party of Conservative Accord in 2001.

Leadership
 1990-1993 - Dr. Ganzwohl 
 1993-2008 - Dr. Fořt
 2008–present - Dr. Kubalčík

External links
Official website

Conservative parties in the Czech Republic
Eurosceptic parties in the Czech Republic
Political parties established in 1990
1990 establishments in Czechoslovakia
Anti-communist parties in the Czech Republic